This article lists players who have captained the Cork under-20 hurling team in the Munster Under-20 Hurling Championship and the All-Ireland Under-20 Hurling Championship. Prior to 2019 the competition had an under-21 age limit.

List of captains

See also
List of Cork senior hurling team captains
List of Cork minor hurling team captains

References

 
Hurling
Cork